Atoloto Kolokilagi is a Wallisian politician and member of the Territorial Assembly of Wallis and Futuna. He was president of the Territorial Assembly of Wallis and Futuna from 2019 to 2020.

On 29 November 2019 he was elected president of the Assembly, defeating Nivaleta Iloai by 10 votes to 9. In February 2020 he visited France to discuss the upcoming France-Oceania summit and the Nouméa Accord.

References

Living people
Wallis and Futuna politicians
Presidents of the Territorial Assembly of Wallis and Futuna
Year of birth missing (living people)